Drosophila willistoni is a species of fruit fly. It was originally described by Alfred Sturtevant in 1916. It ranges from Florida, Mexico and Caribbean islands southwards to Argentina and is the most common Drosophilid fruit fly in the Amazon rainforest.

This fruitfly is widely used for scientific research, including genetic research.

References

External links
 Drosophila willistoni at FlyBase
 Drosophila willistoni at Ensembl Genomes Metazoa

willistoni
Insects described in 1916
Diptera of North America
Diptera of South America
Insects of the Caribbean